Bucșani may refer to several places in Romania:

 Bucșani, Dâmbovița, a commune in Dâmbovița County
 Bucșani, Giurgiu, a commune in Giurgiu County
 Bucșani, a village in Ionești Commune, Vâlcea County

See also
 Bucșa (disambiguation)
 Bucșă - family name from iron bolt on a cartwheel, frequently spelled Bucşa